The men's 4×200 metre freestyle relay was a swimming event held as part of the swimming at the 1924 Summer Olympics programme. It was the fourth appearance of the event, which had been established in 1908. The competition was held from Friday to Sunday, 18 to 20 July 1924.

Records
These were the standing world and Olympic records (in minutes) prior to the 1924 Summer Olympics.

The United States with the line-up Ralph Breyer, Harry Glancy, Dick Howell, and Wally O'Connor broke the world record and the ten-minute barrier in the semifinal with a time of 9:59.4 minutes. In the final when Johnny Weissmuller replaced Howell, the Americans improved their time again to 9:53.4 minutes.

Results

Heats

The fastest two teams in each heat and the fastest third-placed from across the heats advanced.

Heat 1

Heat 2

Heat 3

Heat 4

Semifinals

The fastest two teams in each semi-final and the faster of the two third-placed teams advanced to the final.

Sweden replaced Thor Henning and Gösta Persson with Arne Borg and Åke Borg and Great Britain replaced Leslie Savage with John Thomson. Both teams advanced to the final.

Semifinal 1

Semifinal 2

Final

In the final Johnny Weissmuller replaced Dick Howell in the American team and Boy Charlton replaced Ivan Stedman in the Australian team.

References

External links
Olympic Report
 

Swimming at the 1924 Summer Olympics
4 × 200 metre freestyle relay
Men's events at the 1924 Summer Olympics